Arthur Henry Sovereign FRGS (188116 May 1966) was an Anglican priest in the mid-20th century.

He was born in Woodstock, Ontario in 1881 and educated at the University of Toronto. Ordained in  1906, his first post was as a Curate at Christ Church Cathedral, Vancouver after which he was Rector of  St Mark's, Vancouver. He was Professor of Divinity at the  Anglican Theological College, Vancouver from 1930 until his appointment to the  episcopate as Bishop of Yukon in 1932, but only held the post for ten months. From then until 1950 he was Bishop of Athabasca.

References

1881 births
People from Woodstock, Ontario
University of Toronto alumni
Anglican bishops of Yukon
Anglican bishops of Athabasca
20th-century Anglican Church of Canada bishops
Fellows of the Royal Geographical Society
1966 deaths